Spark of Life is an album by Polish jazz pianist and composer Marcin Wasilewski's Trio with saxophonist Joakim Milder recorded in 2014 and released on the ECM label.

Reception

In JazzTimes Jeff Tamarkin wrote: "Wasilewski and his compatriots habitually roll out one stately, even-tempered melody after the next, giving each plenty of simmer time before ultimately coming out the other side, regardless of what happens along the way, without having broken a sweat. (This is an ECM record, after all.)". The Guardians critic John Fordham observed: "It’s all right up to Wasilewski Trio standards, and Milder is a shadowy but fascinating presence". On All About Jazz John Kelman observed "Spark of Life is another stellar collection from a trio predicated on the value of longevity and leveraging the opportunities this now late-thirty-something trio has been afforded to build a language all its own ... With the addition of Milder on roughly half of this 74-minute program, the Marcin Wasilewski Trio has managed to retain its core strengths while adding something new to avoid any pitfalls of predictability".

Track listing
All compositions by Marcin Wasilewski, except where indicated.
 "Austin" - 7:07
 "Sudovian" - 6:28
 "Spark of Life" - 6:33
 "Do Rycerzy, Do Szlachy, Do Mieszczan" (Pawel Krawczyk, Katarzyna Nosowska, Marcin Żabiełowicz) - 4:37
 "Message In a Bottle" (Sting) - 7:36 	
 "Sleep Safe and Warm" (Krzysztof Komeda) - 6:55
 "Three Reflections" - 8:33 	
 "Still" (Joakim Milder) - 6:44 	
 "Actual Proof" (Herbie Hancock) - 6:05 	
 "Largo" (Grażyna Bacewicz) - 8:05
 "Spark of Life" - 5:01

Personnel
Marcin Wasilewski - piano
Slawomir Kurkiewicz - bass
Michal Miskiewicz - drums
Joakim Milder - tenor saxophone (tracks 2-4, 6 & 8)

References

External links 
Marcin Wasilewski Trio at culture.pl

ECM Records albums
2014 albums
Albums produced by Manfred Eicher
Marcin Wasilewski (pianist) albums